Schoolhill Railway Station was a railway station in the city of Aberdeen, Scotland. The station was closed on 5 April 1937 with the withdrawal of the suburban rail service. The few remains of the station lie adjacent to His Majesty's Theatre's car park. The station formed part of the Denburn Valley Line jointly administered by the Great North of Scotland Railway and Caledonian Railway.

Rail services

References

Disused railway stations in Aberdeen
Former Great North of Scotland Railway stations
Railway stations in Great Britain opened in 1893
Railway stations in Great Britain closed in 1937
1893 establishments in Scotland
1937 disestablishments in Scotland